PHD finger protein 6 is a protein that in humans is encoded by the PHF6 gene.

This gene is a member of the plant homeodomain (PHD)-like finger (PHF) family. It encodes a protein with two atypical PHD-type zinc finger domains, indicating a potential role in transcriptional regulation, that localizes to the nucleolus.

Mutations 

Mutations affecting the coding region of this gene or the splicing of the transcript have been associated with Börjeson-Forssman-Lehmann syndrome (BFLS), a disorder characterized by mental retardation, epilepsy, hypogonadism, hypometabolism, obesity, swelling of subcutaneous tissue of the face, narrow palpebral fissures, and large ears. Alternate transcriptional splice variants, encoding different isoforms, have been characterized.

The PHF6 gene in humans is also frequently mutated in human hematological malignancies, including T-cell acute lymphoblastic Leukemia (T-ALL) and Acute Myeloid Leukemia (AML) and at least two BFLS patients have developed leukemia or lymphoma. PHF6 has been shown to be important for the regulation of blood stem and progenitor cells and loss of PHF6 protein synergizes with over-expression of the TLX3 protein to cause lymphoid neoplasms.

References

Further reading

External links 
 

Transcription factors